The  was a six-person tag team title in the Japanese professional wrestling promotion Dramatic Dream Team, today known as DDT Pro-Wrestling. The title was established in 2003. It has since been unified with the UWA World Trios Championship.

Title history

Championship tournament
On July 20, 2003, a four-team tournament was held to crown the inaugural champions.

Reigns

Combined reigns

By team

By wrestler

See also

Professional wrestling in Japan

References

DDT Pro-Wrestling championships
Trios wrestling tag team championships